The Charged Aerosol Release Experiment also known as CARE, is a project run by NASA which will use a rocket to release dust in the upper atmosphere to form a dusty plasma in space. The clouds thus generated are intended to simulate naturally occurring phenomena called noctilucent clouds, which are the highest clouds in the atmosphere. The CARE experiment is intended to create an artificial dust layer at the boundary of space in a controlled sense, in order to "allow scientists to study different aspects of it, the turbulence generated on the inside, the distribution of dust particles and such."

The dust cloud is generated using the Nihka motor dust generator.  The dust cloud is composed of aluminum oxide, carbon monoxide, hydrogen chloride, water, and nitrogen, as well as smaller amounts of carbon dioxide, hydrogen, monatomic chlorine, and monatomic hydrogen.

According to NASA, Spatial Heterodyne Imager for Mesospheric Radicals (SHIMMER ) instrument will track the CARE dust cloud for days or even months. The SHIMMER instrument has previously viewed natural noctilucent clouds for the past two years. The CARE will be the first space viewing of an artificial noctilucent cloud.

The rocket was set to launch between 7:30 and 7:57 EDT on Tuesday Sept. 14, 2009 from NASA's Wallops Flight Facility in Virginia.

On September 16, 2015, a Black Brant XI sounding rocket was launched from Andoya, Norway and carried 37 rocket motors and a multi-instrument daughter payload into the ionosphere to study the generation of plasma wave electric fields and ionospheric density disturbances by the high-speed injection of dust particles. A primary sensor for the Charged Aerosol Release Experiment (CARE II) was the two SuperDARN CUTLASS radars that view the ocean north of Norway.

See also
 Noctilucent cloud
 polar mesospheric clouds

References

External links
 Night Time Artificial Cloud Study Using NASA Sounding Rocket, NASA
 An Update on theCharged Aerosol Release ExperimentCARE

Cloud types